Martín Basso (born July 26, 1974 in Cordoba) is an Argentine racing driver. He has race in different series, with major success in Formula Three Sudamericana and TC 2000.

He also spent two seasons in the United States, driving in the Toyota Atlantic Championship.

Career 
1995: Argentine Formula Renault Championship  
1996: Argentine Formula Renault Championship (Champion)
1997: Formula Three Sudamericana and Argentine Formula Super Renault Championship
1998: Formula Three Sudamericana and Argentine Formula Super Renault Championship
1999: Formula Three Sudamericana and Argentine Formula Super Renault Championship
2000: Formula Atlantic 
2001: Formula Atlantic 
2002: Euro Formula 3000 and Porsche Supercup 
2003: TC2000 (Honda Civic)
2004: TC2000 (Honda Civic)
2005: TC2000 (Honda Civic)
2006: TC2000 (Ford Focus)
2007: TC2000 (Ford Focus)
2008: TC2000 (Ford Focus)
2009: TC2000 (Ford Focus), Turismo Carretera (Torino)
2010: TC2000 (Ford Focus), Turismo Carretera (Torino)
2011: Turismo Carretera (Chevrolet)
2012: Turismo Carretera (Chevrolet)
2013: Turismo Carretera (Chevrolet)

Complete Euro Formula 3000 results
(key) (Races in bold indicate pole position; races in italics indicate fastest lap)

Porsche Supercup results

1974 births
TC 2000 Championship drivers
Formula 3 Sudamericana drivers
Formula Renault Argentina drivers
Argentine racing drivers
Atlantic Championship drivers
FIA GT Championship drivers
Auto GP drivers
Turismo Carretera drivers
Living people
Porsche Supercup drivers
Piquet GP drivers
Meyer Shank Racing drivers